Robert Erskine Campbell (August 13, 1884 – August 23, 1977) was bishop of the Episcopal Diocese of Liberia, serving from 1925 to 1936. A monk of the Order of the Holy Cross, he was consecrated on November 30, 1925. He also served as superior of the Order of the Holy Cross from 1948 to 1954.

References 
Campbell, Robert Erskine

External links 
Within the Green Wall, by Robert Erskine Campbell (1957)

1884 births
1977 deaths
Bishops of the Episcopal Church (United States)
General Theological Seminary alumni
Members of Anglican religious orders
20th-century American Episcopalians
Liberian Episcopalians
Anglican monks
Anglican bishops of Liberia